Edwin Ashton (9 February 1893 – 1970) was an English professional footballer who played as a winger.

References

1893 births
1970 deaths
People from Hindley, Greater Manchester
English footballers
Association football wingers
Haslingden F.C. players
Grimsby Town F.C. players
Portsmouth F.C. players
Nelson F.C. players
English Football League players